Origo is the fourth full-length album by the Swedish progressive metal band Burst, released on October 17, 2005, by Relapse Records. It received critical acclaim from magazines such as Kerrang! and  Rock Sound.

Aaron Burgess, writing for Alternative Press described the album as "a blistering epic, complete with keyboards, acoustic passages and female backing vocals in tow". He added that "Burst sound ready to, well, burst out of obscurity and into the genre-shattering realm of fellow post-metal masters Isis, Neurosis and Cult Of Luna". Speaking of the album's sound, wrote, "Though frontman Linus Jägerskog's shearing vocals are terminally locked on overdrive, the rest of Origo is a sweeping, time-shifting exploration of dynamics, moods and tonal color--and while "beautiful" isn't usually the sort of adjective we like to throw at a metal record, in this case, it's the rule, not the exception."

The song "Where the Wave Broke" is about Mieszko Talarczyk, the leader of now defunct Swedish grindcore band Nasum, who  died in the 2004 Indian Ocean earthquake and tsunami which hit Thailand on December 26, 2004. Jesper Liveröd was the bass guitarist of Nasum for most of their career.

Track listing

Personnel

Band members<
 Patrik Hultin – drums
 Linus Jägerskog – vocals
 Jesper Liveröd – bass guitar and vocals
 Robert Reinholdz – guitar and vocals
 Jonas Rydberg – guitar

Other personnel
 Robert Johansson – photography
 Henryk Lipp – production
 Fredrik Reinedahl – production
 Wieslaw Walkuski – album artwork

References

2005 albums
Burst (band) albums
Relapse Records albums